is a Japanese surname. Notable people with the surname include:

, Japanese footballer
, Japanese footballer
Sameshima Naonobu (鮫島 尚信, 18451880), Japanese diplomat

Japanese-language surnames